The Philippine House Committee on Science and Technology, or House Science and Technology Committee is a standing committee of the Philippine House of Representatives.

Jurisdiction 
As prescribed by House Rules, the committee's jurisdiction is on science and technology which includes the following:
 Climate and weather forecasting
 Intellectual property rights on biotechnology
 Science and technology education including the Philippine Science High School System
 Scientific and technological research and development
 Technology transfer

Members, 18th Congress

Historical members

18th Congress

Member for the Majority 
 Nestor Fongwan (Benguet–Lone, PDP–Laban)

See also
 House of Representatives of the Philippines
 List of Philippine House of Representatives committees
 Department of Science and Technology

Notes

References

External links 
House of Representatives of the Philippines

Science